Cilician Armenian, also called Middle Armenian, but the former term may be confused for modern dialects, corresponds to the second period in written Armenian with which numerous books were published between the 12th and 18th centuries. It comes after Grabar (Classical Armenian) and before Ashkharhabar (Modern Armenian).

Classical Armenian was predominantly an inflecting and synthetic language, but in Middle Armenian, during the period of Modern Armenian influence, agglutinative and analytical forms influenced the language. In this respect, Middle Armenian is a transition stage from Old Armenian to Modern Armenian or ashkharabar.  Middle Armenian is notable for being the first written form of Armenian to display Western-type voicing qualities and to have introduced the letters օ and ֆ, which were based on the Greek letters "ο" and "φ".

References

External links 
 Dictionary of Middle Armenian (Միջին Հայերենի Բառարան), Ruben Ghazarian, Yerevan, 2009.

Armenian languages
Languages attested from the 12th century